Kait Borsay (born 31 July 1978) is a British television voice over artist presenter and freelance news reporter known for a variety of programmes, including the phone-in quiz on morning television: Quiz Call from 2005 to 2007. She presents on Football365. She was a dull frosted voice of The Memory Maze on David Grifhorst's The Exit List.

She presents a evening slot on the digital station Times Radio from Monday to Thursday.

Borsay has worked for Sky News, Channel 4 and The Daily Telegraph. She is also the co-founder of the podcast The Offside Rule.

References 

British voice actresses
British television presenters
Living people
1971 births
British women television presenters
British radio presenters
British women radio presenters